Thiruthuraipundi is a state assembly constituency in Thiruvarur district of Tamil Nadu, which includes Thiruthuraipoondi. It is a Scheduled Caste reserved constituency. The constituency is in existence since 1957 election. communist party members from Thiruthuraipoondi area played a vital role in abolition of "agricultural bond labours" (pannayal ozhipu) in delta districts. The act was enacted after their continuous struggle. The constituency comprises Kottur, Thiruthuraipoondi and Muthupettai panchayat union. It is one of the 234 State Legislative Assembly Constituencies in Tamil Nadu, in India.

Most successful party: CPI (11 times)

Madras State

Tamil Nadu

Election results

2021

2016

2011

2006

2001

1996

1991

1989

1984

1980

1977

1971

1967

1962

1957

References 

 

Assembly constituencies of Tamil Nadu
Tiruvarur district